Flinders Island Airport  is a small regional airport located  northwest of Whitemark on Flinders Island off the north-east coast of Tasmania, Australia. The airport is owned and operated by the Flinders Council. The airport site has a total area of approximately 134 hectares. Access to the airport is off Palana Road. The primary aviation facilities at Flinders Island Airport consist of two sealed runways, a sealed taxiway, a sealed apron, a grassed apron and a fuel storage facility. Adjacent to the sealed apron is a passenger terminal building with an associated car parking area. There is only one small hangar on the site at present. The primary use of Flinders Island Airport is for Regular Public Transport (RPT) services operated by Sharp Airlines which offers services to and from Melbourne and Launceston. The airport is also used for charter and freight services, emergency services and private/recreational flying.

Airlines and destinations

 This flight operates via Cape Barren Island.

History
In the early postwar years, the airport was served by small passenger aircraft operated by Flinders Island Airways and serving the route from Melbourne's Moorabbin Airport which is located to the southeast of the city.

Traffic and statistics
The following table lists passenger statistics for Flinders Island Airport.

See also
 List of airports in Tasmania

References

External links
 Flinders Island Airport at the Flinders Council

Airports in Tasmania
Flinders Island